In mathematics, a Ramanujan prime is a prime number that satisfies a result proven by Srinivasa Ramanujan relating to the prime-counting function.

Origins and definition
In 1919, Ramanujan published a new proof of Bertrand's postulate which, as he notes, was first proved by Chebyshev. At the end of the two-page published paper, Ramanujan derived a generalized result, and that is:

     

where  is the prime-counting function, equal to the number of primes less than or equal to x.

The converse of this result is the definition of Ramanujan primes:

In other words: Ramanujan primes are the least integers Rn for which there are at least n primes between x and x/2 for all x ≥ Rn.

The first five Ramanujan primes are thus 2, 11, 17, 29, and 41.  

Note that the integer Rn is necessarily a prime number:  and, hence,  must increase by obtaining another prime at x = Rn. Since  can increase by at most 1,

Bounds and an asymptotic formula

For all , the bounds

hold. If , then also

where pn is the nth prime number.

As n tends to infinity, Rn is asymptotic to the 2nth prime, i.e.,

Rn ~ p2n    (n → ∞).

All these results were proved by Sondow (2009), except for the upper bound Rn < p3n which was conjectured by him and proved by Laishram (2010). The bound was improved by Sondow, Nicholson, and Noe (2011) to

which is the optimal form of  Rn ≤ c·p3n since it is an equality for n = 5.

References

Srinivasa Ramanujan
Classes of prime numbers